there was little renewable energy in Belarus but a lot of potential. 7% of primary energy in Belarus  was from renewables in 2019, mostly biofuels. As there is a lot of district heating more renewables could be integrated into that, but this is hindered by fossil fuel subsidies.

Policy 
A 2021 study by the International Renewable Energy Agency (IRENA) recommended:

Revising renewable energy targets
Improving the quota allocation for renewables
Designing renewable energy auctions
Harnessing renewable energy potentials in heating
Developing an energy sector master plan with higher shares of renewables
Adopting a grid code for renewables
Improving variable renewable power generation forecasting
Improving de-risking mechanisms for renewable energy investments
Standardising power purchase agreements
Building human and institutional capacities for renewable energy development

Producers 
About half is from independent power producers.

Economics 
In 2019 energy imports cost 5.5% of GDP, and this could be reduced by increasing renewable energy. According to IRENA this would also create jobs and increase energy security.

Environment 
In 2019 two-thirds of greenhouse gas emissions were from energy, and this could be reduced by increasing renewable energy.

Sources

Biomass
There is large potential from wood waste, crop residue, and biogas from manure. About 10% of district heating is biomass.

Solar power

Wind power

Geothermal 
Although not hot enough for electricity generation it may be possible to integrate geothermal into district heating.

Hydroelectricity
Although small power plants were common before the national grid there is now less than 100MW of hydroelectricity, because the country is flat.

External links 
 Renewable energy sector in Belarus: A review
 Wastewater as a source of renewable energy in Belarus
 EBRD promotes renewable energy in Belarus

References